Ghemati Abdelkrim (born in 1961 in Cherchell, Algeria) is an Algerian former politician and writer. He was a high-ranking leader of the Islamic Salvation Front. Abdelkrim's vision of an Islamic state included establishing it with a democratic system based on a civil state with an elected president and parliament, as well as an independent justice system and opposition parties.

Publications

Personal life
Abdelkrim was born in Cherchell, Algeria, in 1961; his family are of Turkish origin.

References

1961 births
Algerian people of Turkish descent
Islamic Salvation Front politicians
Living people
21st-century Algerian people